Phyllonorycter conista is a moth of the family Gracillariidae. It is known from India (Bihar), Malaysia (Pahang), Nepal, the Philippines (Luzon and Palawan) and Sri Lanka.

The wingspan is 4.7-5.3 mm.

The larvae feed on Urena lobata. They mine the leaves of their host plant. The mine consists of a subtriangular or trapeziform mine on the underside of the leaf, mostly on the basal area of the disc between two lateral veins. The mine is flat and pale greenish in the beginning, but discolours to brown and deforms into a tentiform type at a mature stage.

References

conista
Moths of Asia
Moths described in 1911